The Azores, an autonomous region of Portugal in the northeastern Atlantic Ocean, has experienced the effects of at least 21 Atlantic hurricanes, or storms that were once tropical or subtropical cyclones. The most recent storm to affect the archipelago was Tropical Storm Gaston in 2022.

1990s
 September 30, 1992 - Just days after the previous storm, Tropical Storm Bonnie moved through the central Azores. Wind gusts reached  at Lajes Field. One man was killed by a rock fall on São Miguel.
 November 1, 1995 - Tropical Storm Tanya transitioned into an extratropical storm before moving through the Azores. Tanya knocked down trees and power lines, sank several boats, and damaged houses. A fisherman drowned amid high waves in the archipelago.

 September 30, 1998 - Tropical Storm Jeanne transitioned into an extratropical cyclone while approaching the Azores.

2000s

April 27, 2003 - an extratropical cyclone, formerly Tropical Storm Ana, passed south of the Azores, producing  of rainfall at Ponta Delgada.
Overall impact was limited to toppled trees and power lines, leaving portions of Santa Maria Island without electrical service. 

2010s
The winds knocked down trees, damaged windows, and briefly cut power. Waves  in height caused flooding along the coast.
Nadine turned southeast away from the archipelago, and spent the next 13 days moving across the eastern Atlantic Ocean.
December 7, 2013 - A subtropical storm approached the western Azores and degenerated into a trough.
January 5, 2016 - Tropical Storm Alex made landfall on Terceira Island, hours after weakening below hurricane status. Rainfall totaled  in Lagoa, São Miguel. Wind gusts reached  in Ponta Delgada. One person suffering a heart attack died as an indirect result of Alex when turbulence from the storm hindered their emergency helicopter from taking off in time. Alex triggered a few landslides, and damaged homes from its winds.
October 14, 2017 - Hurricane Ophelia passed south of the Azores as the easternmost major hurricane on record.
September 15, 2018 - Tropical Storm Helene passed west of the Azores, where it was estimated to have produced tropical storm force winds.
At the Port of Lajes das Flores port building and some cargo containers were swept away, while the dock itself was partially damaged. Total damage across the island chain were around €330 million (US$362 million).
October 31, 2019 - Subtropical Storm Rebekah passed to the north of The Azores as it was dissipating, bringing only negligible effects.

2020s
September 17–18, 2020 - The extratropical remnants of Hurricane Paulette moved through the islands.

Climatology

Deadly storms
The following is a list of Atlantic tropical storms that caused fatalities in the Azores.

See also

Lists of Atlantic hurricanes
Tropical cyclone effects in Europe

References

Lists of tropical cyclones by area
Τ
Hurricanes in Europe